Glutamate receptor-interacting protein 2 is a protein that in humans is encoded by the GRIP2 gene.

Interactions 

GRIP2 has been shown to interact with liprin-alpha-1.

References

Further reading

| citation =